Chocophorus carabayus is a moth of the family Pterophoridae. It is found in Argentina, Ecuador and Peru.

The wingspan is 15–19 mm. The head is scaled in grey-white mixed pale ferruginous scales. The face is grey-brown. The antennae are grey-brown. The thorax and tegulae are pale ferruginous-white with pale ferruginous longitudinal lines. The forewings are dark chocolate grey-brown with white lines converging into a
single spot and a transverse band at one third of the wing. The fringes are grey-brown, but white at the region of the anal angle of both lobes, at the costa of the first lobe and the opposite dorsum and costa of the second lobe. The hindwings are dark ferruginous-brown, slightly mixed ochreous-brown in the first lobe basal half. The fringes are grey-brown with some white dashes. Adults have been recorded in January, March, July, September and October.

References

Moths described in 1990
Pterophoridae of South America